The Case Against Mrs. Ames is a 1936 mystery-drama film written by C. Graham Baker and Gene Towne based on a serial of the same name by Arthur Somers Roche originally published in Collier's Weekly magazine in 1934, and then as a novel in 1936. The film was directed by William A. Seiter and stars Madeleine Carroll and George Brent, and features Arthur Treacher, Alan Baxter, Beulah Bondi and Alan Mowbray.

Cast

Madeleine Carroll as Hope Ames
George Brent as Matt Logan
Arthur Treacher as Griggsby
Alan Baxter as Lou
Beulah Bondi as Mrs. Livingston Ames
Alan Mowbray as Lawrence Waterson
Brenda Fowler as Mrs. Shumway
Esther Dale as Matilda
Edward Brophy as Sid
Richard Carle as Uncle Gordon
Scotty Beckett as Bobbie Ames
Mayo Methot as Cora
Guy Bates Post as Judge John Davis
June Brewster as Laurette La Rue
Elvira Curci as Jeanette
Jonathan Hale as Judge at First Trial

Cast notes
The Case Against Mrs. Ames was Madeleine Carroll's American film debut.

Reception
The Case Against Mrs. Ames recorded a loss of $38,869.

References
Notes

External links

1936 films
Films directed by William A. Seiter
Films produced by Walter Wanger
American black-and-white films
1930s mystery drama films
American mystery drama films
1936 drama films
Paramount Pictures films
1930s American films